Luis Ángel Peralta Ramírez is a Nicaraguan footballer who plays for Deportivo Walter Ferretti.

References

Living people
Association football midfielders
Nicaraguan men's footballers
Nicaragua international footballers
2017 Copa Centroamericana players
2017 CONCACAF Gold Cup players
1988 births